The fifth season of 7th Heaven—an American family-drama television series, created and produced by Brenda Hampton—premiered on October 2, 2000, on The WB, and concluded on May 21, 2001 (22 episodes).

Cast and characters

Main

Stephen Collins as Eric Camden
Catherine Hicks as Annie Camden
Barry Watson as Matt Camden
Jessica Biel as Mary Camden (episodes 1–7, 10–12, 14-16, 18 and 21–22)
David Gallagher as Simon Camden
Beverley Mitchell as Lucy Camden
Mackenzie Rosman as Ruthie Camden

Chaz Lamar Shepherd as John Hamilton
Adam LaVorgna as Robbie Palmer (episodes 9–22)
Happy as Happy the Dog

Episodes

References

2000 American television seasons
2001 American television seasons